The Lie (1912) is a silent war drama/romance motion picture short starring King Baggot and Lottie Briscoe.

Directed by King Baggot and William Robert Daly and produced by Carl Laemmle's IMP Studios, the screenplay was written by A. Castlebaum.

Synopsis
The Lie is set during the American Civil War.

Cast
King Baggot as Captain Robert Evans
Lottie Briscoe as Edith Hobson
William E. Shay as Lieutenant Hobson
William Robert Daly as Mr. Hobson

External links
The Lie at the Internet Movie Database

1912 films
American silent short films
American black-and-white films
American Civil War films
American romantic drama films
War romance films
Films directed by King Baggot
1912 romantic drama films
1910s American films
Silent romantic drama films
Silent war drama films
Silent American drama films
1910s English-language films